Paris is known as the City of Light. Part of the credit for this sobriquet can be ascribed to long-standing city ordinances that have restricted the height of buildings in the central city. A more modest skyline, interrupted only by the Eiffel Tower, the Tour Montparnasse, Sacré-Coeur, and a few church steeples, lends this city's citizens virtually unfettered access to natural light. Nonetheless, another significant contributor to the feeling of openness in Paris is the vast number of public spaces, both green and paved, interspersed throughout all twenty arrondissements, that afford the citizen the opportunity to escape, if only momentarily, his urban environment and partake of air and light like his cousins in the provinces. The following article (and its accompanying list) concern the public spaces known as squares and places in Paris.

Terminology 
The terminology of open spaces in Paris (square vs. place) may present some confusion to English speakers.

In the French language, the term square (a loan-word from English) refers to a small urban green space that is not large enough to be called a parc (the grassy variety) or a bois (the wooded variety), and is not sufficiently formal in its plantings to be called a jardin. (For a list of these spaces, see List of parks and gardens in Paris.) In English this may be called a "pocket park," a "green" as in "the village green", or even a "square", as in the squares of Savannah, Georgia.

Conversely, the term place in French refers to a city square which usually does not include green space and may be paved. In the English-speaking world, this is usually termed a "square" such as Times Square in New York or Trafalgar Square in London.

In summary, the French have squares that might be, but are usually not, called "squares" in English, and they have places that are almost always called "squares" in English.

Squares and places 

To make things a bit more complicated, in Paris, a "square" (small green space) may abut a place (large public square), or a "square" may, in fact, be contained within a place. The "square" and the associated place typically have different names. Some examples are:

 Square des Innocents and Place Joachim du Bellay
 Square Marcel Pagnol and Place Henri Bergson
 Square des Batignolles and Place Charles Fillion
 Square Berlioz and Place Adolphe Max
 Square de la Trinité and Place d'Estienne-d'Orves
 Square Saint-Vincent-de-Paul and Place Franz Liszt
 Square Monseigneur Maillet and Place des Fêtes
 Square Thomas Jefferson and Place des États-Unis

Rarely, the "square" and its associated place share a name:

 Square Ferdinand Brunot and Place Ferdinand Brunot
 Square de la Chapelle and Place de la Chapelle

Finally, there are some pairs (of squares and places) where the name of the square is a bit artificial, but the relationship is, nonetheless, clear:

 Square de la place André-Masson
 Square de la place Dauphine
 Square de la place de Bitche
 Square de la place de la Bataille de Stalingrad
 Square de la place de la Nation
 Square de la place de la Réunion
 Square de la place d'Italie
 Square de la place du Commerce
 Square de la place Étienne Pernet
 Square de la place Pasdeloup

Characteristics of Parisian squares 

In all Parisian squares, gardens, and parks, you will find areas reserved for children, with playgrounds, sandboxes, see-saws, swings, merry-go-rounds, and the like. Some spaces offer a wider range of activities; some random examples are: toy boats to sail, as well as sulky and go-cart rentals in the Jardin du Luxembourg; ping-pong tables in the Square Emile-Chautemps and the Jardin de l'Observatoire; pony or carriage rides at the Parc Monceau; tennis courts, boules, and croquet at the Jardin du Luxembourg; Guignol marionette puppet shows at the Jardin du Ranelagh; roller skating at the Parc Montsouris; a bee-keeping school at the Jardin du Luxembourg; bandstands featuring spring and summer concerts at the Square du Temple and the Parc des Buttes-Chaumont, etc.

These open spaces also beckon visitors just to wander and daydream, and many offer lush green lawns for sitting, taking a rest, or perhaps a picnic. One is advised, nonetheless, to watch for signs posted on lawns that are accessible to the public: pelouses autorisées (lawns authorized for use) and "pelouses au repos" (lawns for resting).

List of squares and places in Paris 

As of 1 May 2008, the city of Paris acknowledged the following public squares (in the broader 'English' sense of the word). A citizen of Paris will notice, of course, that the following alphabetized list includes both "squares" (smaller green spaces) and places (larger urban landmarks), which have been segregated from one another within this single list.

0/9 
 Place du 11-Novembre-1918
 Place du 18-Juin-1940
 Place du 25-Août-1944
 Place du 8 Février 1962
 Place du 8 Novembre 1942

A

B

C

D

E

F

G

H

I

J

K

L

M

N

O

P

Q

R

S

T

U

V

W

Y

See also 
 Paris
 Arrondissements of Paris
 List of parks and gardens in Paris

External links 

 Base de données, nomenclature et historique des voies de Paris
 Cadastre de Paris

References 

 
Geography of Paris